Maria Machteld van Sypesteyn (1724–1774) was a painter from the Netherlands.

Family 
Maria Machteld van Sypesteyn was born in Haarlem as the daughter of the mayor Cornelis Ascanius van Sypesteyn (1694–1744), baljuw van Brederode, and Maria de Lange (1696–1744).

Life 
Maria became a pupil of the Haarlem miniature painter Henriëtte Wolters-van Pee, who she probably met through her father, who was a regent of the Proveniershuis where Henrëtte lived. She is known for miniatures on ivory in the manner of her teacher. 

Maria married the wealthy mr. Pieter van Schuylenburch,  Moermond  (1714–1764) on 9 July 1743 in The Hague and the couple lived in Haarlem, where her husband became mayor in the 1760s. He died relatively young in 1764 and was buried in the family grave in the St. Bavochurch. 

In 1767 Maria remarried to another member of the Haarlem regency, mr. David van Lennep, who contracted Jurriaan Andriessen to paint new wall decorations in his Huis te Manpad for her.

Sypesteyn died in Heemstede and was buried in the St. Bavochurch. Most of her works are still in the family collection.

Gallery

References 

 Maria Machteld van Sypesteyn on blog by Hans Krol
 Maria Machteld van Sypesteyn in 1001 Vrouwen uit de Nederlandse geschiedenis

1724 births
1774 deaths
Painters from Haarlem
18th-century Dutch painters
Dutch women painters
18th-century Dutch women artists